Thomas K. Gilhool (September 10, 1938 – August 22, 2020) was an American civil rights attorney. Noted as an advocate for the rights of people with disabilities, he served as the chief counsel for the Public Interest Law Center in Philadelphia from 1975 until 2000.

Gilhool was the lead counsel in Pennsylvania Association for Retarded Citizens (PARC) v. Commonwealth of Pennsylvania, which established the constitutional right of children with disabilities to a free, appropriate public education. The case triggered 32 federal court decisions, with Congress enacting the Education for All Handicapped Children Act – which became the Individuals with Disabilities Education Act – in 1975. Gilhool also represented the parents of institutional residents in Halderman vs. Pennhurst State School and Hospital, a landmark case which concluded that developmentally disabled patients under state care have a constitutional right to appropriate treatment and education.

Initially focused on law related to poverty, Gilhool began his career as a public interest lawyer in the 1960s.  He won the first legal services case to reach the United States Supreme Court, Smith v. Reynolds, in which the Court struck down the durational residency requirement for public assistance benefits.

References

External links
  Oral history (Temple University Institute on Disabilities)

1938 births
2020 deaths
American lawyers
American disability rights activists
Lehigh University alumni
Yale University alumni
Yale Law School alumni
People from Ardmore, Pennsylvania